Ross-shire was a Scottish county constituency of the House of Commons of the Parliament of Great Britain from 1708 to 1801 and of the  Parliament of the United Kingdom from 1801 to 1832.

Creation
The British parliamentary constituency was created in 1708 following the Acts of Union, 1707 and replaced the former Parliament of Scotland shire constituency of Ross-shire

History
The constituency elected one Member of Parliament (MP) by the first past the post system until the seat was abolished for the 1832 general election.

 In 1832 it was merged with Cromartyshire to form Ross and Cromarty.

Members of Parliament

References

Historic parliamentary constituencies in Scotland (Westminster)
Constituencies of the Parliament of the United Kingdom established in 1708
Constituencies of the Parliament of the United Kingdom disestablished in 1832